The Jamaica Airline Pilots Association is a trade union in Jamaica.

See also

 List of trade unions

External links
 JALPA
 Caribbean Airline Pilots Association
 International Federation of Air Line Pilots' Associations

Transport trade unions in Jamaica
Airline pilots' trade unions
Aviation organisations based in Jamaica